Andy Bialk (born November 16, 1971) is an American animator and character designer. He was also known for portraying a high school student in the music video for Nirvana's "Smells Like Teen Spirit".

Education
BA, Studio Arts, emphasis animation & Graphic design at the Loyola Marymount University (1989-1993).

Filmography

Television

Film

Music videos

Awards and nominations

References

External links
 

Living people
Place of birth missing (living people)
Animators from California
Loyola Marymount University alumni
1971 births